Porolepiformes is an order of prehistoric lobe-finned fish which lived during the Devonian period (about 416 to 359 million years ago). They are thought to represent the sister group to lungfish (class Dipnoi). The group contains two families: Holoptychiidae and Porolepididae.

Porolepiformes was established by the Swedish paleontologist Erik Jarvik, and were thought to have given rise to the salamanders and caecilians independently of the other tetrapods. He based this conclusion on the shapes of the snouts of the aforementioned groups. This view is no longer in favour in Paleontology.

Jarvik also claimed the existence of choanae in porolepiformes which linked them to tetrapods, but this has remained controversial. Recent phylogenetic reconstruction places porolepiformes close to lungfishes.

More recent evidence has shown that at least one genus Laccognathus was most likely amphibious.

Phylogeny
Mikko's Phylogeny Archive

References

 
Prehistoric lobe-finned fish
Prehistoric fish orders